Politi may refer to:

Persons
Bassano Politi (died in 16th century), Italian mathematician
Gerolamo Politi (died 1575), Italian Roman Catholic prelate who served as Bishop of Trevico
Giancarlo Politi (born 1937), Italian art critic and publisher
Lancelotto Politi (religious name Ambrosius Catharinus) (1483–1553), Italian Dominican canon lawyer
Leo Politi (1908–1996), Italian-American artist and author
Odorico Politi (1785-1846), Italian painter
Paul Politi  (born 1943), American songwriter
Mark Politi  (born 1962), Entrepreneur

Others
Police of Denmark
Norwegian Police Service

See also
Politis (disambiguation)